Geumgok-dong (금곡동, 金谷洞) is neighborhood of Bundang district in the city of Seongnam, Gyeonggi Province, South Korea. It is officially divided into Geumgok-1-dong and Geumgok-2-dong.

Bundang
Neighbourhoods in South Korea